Jindalee may refer to:

 Jindalee, New South Wales
 Jindalee, Queensland
 Jindalee, Western Australia
 Jindalee Operational Radar Network

See also
 Jindalee Lady, 1990 film